The 90th Regiment Illinois Volunteer Infantry was an infantry regiment that served in the Union Army during the American Civil War.

Service
The 90th Illinois Infantry was organized at Chicago, Illinois and mustered into Federal service on September 7, 1862.  Nicknamed the "Irish Legion" or the "Second Irish". On two occasions, the unit included a disguised woman (Frances Elizabeth Quinn) in its ranks. The first time she was discovered and dismissed within a month by Colonel Tomothy O'Meara. She rejoined under a different name, and a new commander, a year later. She was successful until captured and discovered by confederate soldiers.

The regiment was mustered out on June 10, 1865.

Total strength and casualties
The regiment suffered 2 officers and 58 enlisted men who were killed in action or who died of their wounds and 1 officer and 87 enlisted men who died of disease, for a total of 148 fatalities.

Commanders
 Colonel Timothy O'Meara - killed in action at the Battle of Missionary Ridge.
 Lieutenant Colonel Owen Stewart - Mustered out with the regiment.

See also
List of Illinois Civil War Units
Illinois in the American Civil War

Notes

References
The Civil War Archive

External links
 Battle Flags of the 90th Illinois Volunteer Infantry

Units and formations of the Union Army from Illinois
1862 establishments in Illinois
Military units and formations established in 1862
Military units and formations disestablished in 1865